is a former Japanese football player. He played for Japan national team and currently managing the Japan under-17 team.

Club career
Moriyama was born in Kumamoto on November 9, 1967. After graduating from University of Tsukuba, he joined Mazda (later Sanfrecce Hiroshima) in 1991. The club won the 2nd place in J1 League and 1995 Emperor's Cup. He moved to Yokohama Flügels in 1996, Júbilo Iwata in 1998 and Bellmare Hiratsuka in 1999. He retired end of 1999 season.

National team career
On July 8, 1994, Moriyama debuted for Japan national team against Ghana. He was also selected Japan for 1994 Asian Games and played all matches. He played 7 games for Japan in 1994.

Club statistics

National team statistics

References

External links

Japan National Football Team Database

1967 births
Living people
University of Tsukuba alumni
Association football people from Kumamoto Prefecture
Japanese footballers
Japan international footballers
Japan Soccer League players
J1 League players
Sanfrecce Hiroshima players
Yokohama Flügels players
Júbilo Iwata players
Shonan Bellmare players
Association football defenders
Footballers at the 1994 Asian Games
Asian Games competitors for Japan